The name Ada was used for two tropical cyclones, one each in the South-West Indian Ocean and in the Southwest Pacific Ocean.

In the South-West Indian Ocean:
Tropical Cyclone Ada (1961), made landfall in Madagascar

In the Southwest Pacific Ocean:
Cyclone Ada (1970), a category 3 severe tropical cyclone that made landfall in Queensland

The name Ada was retired from use in the Australian region after the 1969–70 season.

Australian region cyclone set index articles
South-West Indian Ocean cyclone set index articles